Khrenovo is a rural locality (a village) in Kopninskoye Rural Settlement, Sobinsky District, Vladimir Oblast, Russia. The population was 105 as of 2010.

Geography 
The village is located on the Undolka River, 8 km north-west from Sobinka.

References 

Rural localities in Sobinsky District